The narrownecked oceanic eel, Derichthys serpentinus, is a longneck eel, the only species in the genus Derichthys, found in all oceans in depths between 500 and 2,000 m.

The skin is scaleless and red-brown.  It lives on the bottom at great depths.

References

 
 
 Tony Ayling & Geoffrey Cox, Collins Guide to the Sea Fishes of New Zealand,  (William Collins Publishers Ltd, Auckland, New Zealand 1982) 

Derichthyidae

Fish described in 1884